Vange or Vänge may refer to:

People
 Vange Leonel (1963–2014), Brazilian singer-songwriter, novelist, playwright, feminist and LGBT activist
 Vange Milliet (1967–), Brazilian singer-songwriter and photographer

Locations
 Vange, a former village in England currently subsumed within the urban area of the Basildon borough of Essex
 Vänge, a locality situated in Uppsala County in Sweden, previously known as Brunna
 Vänge, Gotland, a settlement on Gotland, Sweden

Music
 Vange (album), the debut album by Vange Leonel (see above), released in 1991